James Francis Browne   was an Anglican Archdeacon in India in the late 19th century.
 
Browne was educated at the London College of Divinity  and ordained in 1867. After curacies in Middleton Tyas  and  Bath he went as a Chaplain to Madras. He served at Cannanore, Secunderabad, Black Town and Bangalore. He was  Archdeacon of Madras from 1884 to 1891. Returning to England he was the incumbent in Flax Bourton from 1892 to 1894.

References

19th-century Indian Anglican priests
Alumni of the London College of Divinity
Archdeacons of Madras

Year of birth missing
Year of death missing